Sherpa Glacier is  east of Mount Stuart and north of Sherpa Peak, in the U.S. state of Washington. According to the USGS, this glacier is "named for a mountaineering club active in the area since the 1950s." Sherpa Glacier is within the Alpine Lakes Wilderness of Wenatchee National Forest.

See also
List of glaciers in the United States

References

Glaciers of the North Cascades
Glaciers of Chelan County, Washington
Glaciers of Washington (state)